Tisamenus draconina is a species of stick insect in the family Heteropterygidae native to the Philippines.

Description 

The species is elongated and is described as the spiniest of the genus. The triangle on the mesonotum typical of the genus is flat and ends, as in Tisamenus lachesis, with interposterior mesonotal spines. The two front angles of the triangle in compound spines forming a toothed crest, the largest element of which is slightly removed from the actual angles. A pair of median metanotals, that is, middle spines on the metanotum, are present. The side edges of the meso- and metanotum are reinforced with long spines. There are only four spines on each side of the mesonatal margins, while there are usually five in similar species. On each side of the metathorax there is a lateral spine and a very large supraoxal spine, i.e. a spine located above the coxa. In contrast to many other Tisamenus species, Tisamenus draconina lacks median spines on the upper surface of the anterior segments of the abdomen. Instead, there are only flat nodules or tubercles here. A spine is attached to each side of the first four abdominal segments, with the front spines being longer and more pronounced than the rear ones.

Distribution 

While the first description only mentions the Philippines as a distribution area, James Abram Garfield Rehn and his son John William Holman Rehn specify this and state the sub-province of Apayao on Luzon as the locality of the eight specimens they examined. The localities of Taiwan and Borneo seem doubtful.

Taxonomy 

John Obadiah Westwood described the species in 1848 under the basionym Phasma (Pachymorpha) draconinum and depicts a female. As early as 1859 he transferred it to the genus Acanthoderus established by George Robert Gray in 1834. Carl Stål names the species in 1875 as belonging to the genus Tisamenus described by him. However, in the combination of the generic and species names, he only names the newly described Tisamenus serratorius and Acanthoderus deplanatus, also described by Westwood, abbreviated as T. deplanato (today Tisamenus deplanatus) and counts Acanthoderus draconinus Westw. only at the end as belonging to this genus. While William Forsell Kirby followed this assignment in 1904 and named the species for the first time in combination with the genus name, Josef Redtenbacher 1906, Lawrence Bruner 1915 and also Philip Edward Bragg 1995 cite Stål with an alleged assignment of the species to Hoploclonia. In fact, Stål only names their type species Hoploclonia gecko in this genus. Redtenbacher mentions 1906 neither the work of Kirby nor its genus assignment and treats the species as a representative of Hoploclonia. He again depicts a female of the species and names specimens from Westwood from the Hofmuseum Vienna (now the Natural History Museum in Vienna) as well as specimens from Borneo from the collection of Staudinger (probably Otto Staudinger) and his own collection as the material examined. Because Tisamenus draconina does not occur on Borneo, Bragg assumes in 1995 and 1998 that the material was at least partially confused or mixed with Hoploclonia cuspidata, although this was described by Redtenbacher in that same work using a female. In 1939, Rehn and Rehn cite Stål's correct assignment, but transfer the species to Hoploclonia, just like all other representatives of this genus, and synonymize Tisamenus with it. The Philippine representatives they lead in Hoploclonia divide them into different groups according to morphological aspects. In the so-called Draconina group, they placed with Hoploclonia draconina, as well as the newly described Hoploclonia hystrix (today Tisamenus hystrix) and Hoploclonia lachesis (today Tisamenus lachesis), very strongly spined, elongated and long-legged species. Up to 2004, Tisamenus draconina is continued in almost all works in Hoploclonia. It was Oliver Zompro who put it back in Tisamenus together with all the other Philippine representatives, thus following both Stål and Kirby's assignment.

A female lectotype and a male paralectotype are found in the Oxford University Museum of Natural History. Apart from the information about the collector D. Cuming, both are missing further find information. They were selected as types by Bragg in 1995.

Gallery

References

External links

Phasmatodea
Insects described in 1848